The South Asian Survey is a forum to share fresh thinking and to debate matters of national and regional concern to the countries of South Asia from their perspective.

The journal is published twice a year by SAGE Publications (New Delhi), and debates issues of national and regional concern primarily from the perspectives of politics, economics and international relations, and also draws upon insights from the fields of culture, history and mass communications.

This journal is a member of the Committee on Publication Ethics (COPE).

Abstracting and indexing 
South Asian Survey is abstracted and indexed in:
 ProQuest: International Bibliography of the Social Sciences (IBSS)
 SCOPUS
 DeepDyve
 Portico
 Dutch-KB
 Pro-Quest-RSP
 EBSCO
 OCLC
 Ohio
 ICI
 Bibliography of Asian Studies (BAS)
 J-Gate

External links 
 
 Homepage

References 

 http://publicationethics.org/members/south-asian-survey=COPE

SAGE Publishing academic journals
Publications established in 1994
South Asia